Acinetobacter dispersus is a bacterium from the genus of Acinetobacter.

References

External links
Type strain of Acinetobacter dispersus at BacDive -  the Bacterial Diversity Metadatabase

Moraxellaceae
Bacteria described in 2016